Mahout is a Wilayat of Al Wusta in the Sultanate of Oman.

References 

Populated places in Oman